Konjsko Brdo is a village in the municipality of Perušić, Lika-Senj County, Croatia.

Population
The population in 2011 was 118.

References

Municipalities of Croatia
Populated places in Lika-Senj County